Manuc Bey (the common Romanian rendering of Manuk Bey, the Armenian name of Emanuel Mârzayan; 1769–1817) was an Armenian merchant, diplomat and inn-keeper.

Life
He was born in Rousse (modern Ruse, Bulgaria) as a subject of the Ottoman Empire. 
A grain merchant, he amassed considerable wealth, and was rumored at the time to be the wealthiest man in the Balkans. In 1803, he was awarded the boyar rank of paharnic by Constantine Ypsilanti, Prince of Wallachia.

In 1808, the highly influential Manuc was advanced by his protector, the Ottoman general Alemdar Mustafa Pasha, to occupy the Moldavian throne, but was prevented from taking the throne by the fall of his protector; he himself had to flee Istanbul to avoid execution. Settling in Bucharest (after a short period of refuge in Transylvania), Manuc-Bey kept the inn known today as Manuc's Inn; in time, he also acquired estates in Bessarabia, near Hînceşti and Reni, and was to remain the main financial backer of Ypsilanti, lending the treasury 160,000 thalers in all.

During the Russo-Turkish War of 1806-1812, he was also a mediator (1809) between the Russian Imperial Army of Mikhail Andreyevich Miloradovich and a rebel Ottoman garrison in Giurgiu. A Russian agent, Manuc took part in the negotiations for the 1812 Treaty of Bucharest between the Russian and Ottoman empires, which were held in his inn in Bucharest.

Towards the end of his life, he retired to his estate of Hîncești, where his son later built a manor house.

Manuc died in an accident in 1817, and was buried in the Armenian Church in Chişinău.

References
Neagu Djuvara, Între Orient și Occident. Țările române la începutul epocii moderne ("Between Orient and Occident. The Romanian lands at the beginning of the modern era"), Humanitas, Bucharest, 1995, p. 169, 287, 348-349
Constantin C. Giurescu, Istoria Bucureștilor. Din cele mai vechi timpuri pînă în zilele noastre ("History of Bucharest. From the earliest times to this day"), Ed. Pentru Literatură, Bucharest, 1966, p. 270-271.

External links
  Article One of his palatial residences in Hânceşti (now in the Republic of Moldova, and  a short description
  Spiritual Romania Dream Tour: Manuc's Inn, includes a tidbit about Manuc-Bey in Paris.

1769 births
1817 deaths
Bulgarian people of Armenian descent
Armenians from the Ottoman Empire
Romanian people of Armenian descent
Dragomans
People from Ruse, Bulgaria
Romanian nobility
Romanian restaurateurs
18th-century businesspeople from the Ottoman Empire
19th-century businesspeople from the Ottoman Empire
18th-century translators